Angy may refer to:

Angy, Oise, a commune in France
Kangy Angy, New South Wales, a suburb in Australia
Angy Fernández (born 1990), Spanish singer
Angy Palumbo (died 1960), Italian musician
Angy Rivera, American activist

See also
Angela (given name)
Angie (disambiguation)